The Japan Academy Prize for Outstanding Performance by an Actor in a Supporting Role is an award presented annually by the Japan Academy Prize Association.

At the 1st Japan Academy Prize ceremony held in 1978, Tetsuya Takeda was the first winner of this award for his role in The Yellow Handkerchief. Since its inception, the award has been given to 36 actors. Naoto Takenaka has received the most awards in this category with three awards. As of the 2019 ceremony, Tori Matsuzaka is the most recent winner in this category for his role as Shūichi Hioka in The Blood of Wolves.

Winners

Multiple wins
The following individuals received two or more Best Supporting Actor awards:

References

Outstanding Performance by an Actor in a Supporting Role
Film awards for supporting actor